Palsoda is a village, in nanduratehsil of Buldhana district, Maharashtra State,  India.

Geography
It is located on ODR 6 Other District Road on the way toward Wadgaon Pr Adgaon - Malegaon Bazar on MH SH 195,  in the east direction from Bawanbir, which is on MH State Highway 173 connecting Shegaon - Warwat Bakal - Banoda Eklara - Bawanbir and Tunki. It lies on the banks of Vaan River.

Demographics
 India census, Palsoda had a population of 1236.

Description 

Some of nearby villages are Tamgaon, Bodkha, Wakana, Ladnapur, Tunki,  Sagoda, Dhamangaon, Palsi Zasi, Kolad, Banoda Eklara, Wadgaon Pr Adgaon, Kakanwada Bk, Kakanwada Kh, Pimpri Adgaon, Niwana, Warwat Bakal, Jamod, Durgadatiya, Wankhed, Danapur, Hingani Bk, Raikhed, Belkhed, Gadegaon, Tudgaon, Isapur, Malegaon Bazar,

Nearby towns are Sonala, Akot, Sangrampur, Jalgaon Jamod, Telhara, Shegaon
.

References

Villages in Buldhana district